Tutti (뚜띠) is a Korean female duo consisting of members No Hyun Jung and No Jung Hyun.

Member profiles

Both members No Hyun Jung and No Jung Hyun were born on August 5, 1977.

Discography
 Kiss The Future, 1996. 11 1st ed.(Samsung Music)
 Kiss The Future (0:55)
 대리만족 (3:44)
 콩쥐 팥쥐 (3:59)
 절제의 미 (4:06)
 겨울 연인 (3:38)
 완전 범죄 (3:47)
 사랑하기 때문에 (4:04) - original: Yoo Jae Ha, 1987
 키스의 여왕 (3:49)
 데릴라 사랑 (4:11)
 잠시만의 이별 (4:02)
 잠시만의 이별 (연주)
 Kiss The Future, 1997 Special ed. 13 track (Samsung Music)
 Kiss The Future (0:55)
 대리만족 Remix (3:44)
 Love Summer (3:38)
 완전 범죄 (3:47)
 콩쥐 팥쥐 (3:59)
 사랑하기 때문에 (4:04)
 키스의 여왕 (3:49)
 대리만족 (3:47)
 절제의 미 (4:06)
 겨울 연인 (3:38) 
 데릴라 사랑 (4:11)
 잠시만의 이별 (4:02)
 잠시만의 이별 (연주)
 본색 (本色), 2000 (Miracle Entertainment)
 Intro	
 본색(本色) - Part 1
 Baby I Love You - Part 1
 Happy Ending
 후회(後悔)
 다짐
 애원(哀怨)
 가슴이 떨려와요
 상처
 Loving You
 바램
 본색(本色) - Part 2
 Baby I Love You - Part 2
 Runa: Crazy, 2002.1 (WEA)
 Intro
 첨봐 첨봐
 Baby I Love (U) - 2000 2nd Album
 후회
 본색 - 2000 2nd Album
 바램
 Loving You
 Happy Ending
 다짐
 애원
 첨봐 첨봐 (Instrumental)
 Semi Trot Song No.1, 2004 (Seeyoung)
 짝짝짝
 사랑가
 해버려
 때문에
 짝짝짝 (MR)
 사랑가 (MR)
 해버려 (MR)
 때문에 (MR)
 Happiness, 2006 (EMI Music Korea Ltd)
 삼백원 
 병아리 
 짝짝짝 
 사랑가 
 해버려 
 때문에 
 삼백원 (Remix) 
 삼백원 (Remix) (MR) 
 짝짝짝 (MR) 
 삼백원 (MR) 
 해버려 (MR) 
 삼백원 (M/V)

External links
 Tutti discography at Trifecta homepage

K-pop music groups